Miyandasht Rural District is in Miyandasht District of Darmian County, South Khorasan province, Iran. At the National Census of 2006, its population (as a part of the Central District) was 9,791 in 2,385 households. There were 10,378 inhabitants in 2,851 households at the following census of 2011. At the most recent census of 2016, the population of the rural district was 9,811 in 2,808 households. The largest of its 23 villages was Nughab, with 3,520 people. After the census, Miyandasht and Fakhrud Rural District were combined to form the new Miyandasht District.

References 

Darmian County

Rural Districts of South Khorasan Province

Populated places in South Khorasan Province

Populated places in Darmian County